Zaļā birze (Green grove) is one of the modern neighbourhoods of Liepāja, Latvia and is located in the north-eastern part of the city.   The Zaļā birze neighborhood hosts the Liepāja Central Hospital and the Liepāja Business Center.

References

Neighbourhoods in Liepāja